Tamás Alexits (born 5 January 1994) is a  Hungarian professional darts player who plays in Professional Darts Corporation events.
He made his PDC European Tour debut in the 2018 Austrian Darts Open, but was defeated 6–1 by Jason Cullen.

He also represented Hungary in the 2018 PDC World Cup of Darts along with Nándor Bezzeg, but they lost 5–3 in the first round to the South African pairing of Devon Petersen and Liam O'Brien.

References

External links

1994 births
Living people
Hungarian darts players
People from Sopron
PDC World Cup of Darts Hungarian team
Sportspeople from Győr-Moson-Sopron County